Cathy Rojas (born October 1991) is a Colombian-American educator and political activist who was the Party for Socialism and Liberation's candidate for mayor of New York City in the 2021 election. A public school teacher by trade, Rojas received around 2.5% of the vote in the mayoral election, placing third.

Early life
Rojas was born in the early 1990s to two Colombian immigrants in Queens, New York. She speaks English and Spanish. Her father was an auto body painter, and her mother a housekeeper. She experienced racism from a young age, and in public school was made aware of the fact that students were expelled or arrested instead of being offered the mental health services. Rojas became a socialist after reading The Autobiography of Malcolm X in high school. She worked as a hostess, a waitress, a bartender, and a cook before becoming a teacher.

Mayoral campaign
Rojas launched her mayoral campaign on June 28, 2021, in front of the First Spanish United Methodist Church in East Harlem, a church known for its occupation by the Young Lords in 1969. She ran on a hard leftist and socialist platform.

Rojas did not qualify for the mayoral debates due to her poor fundraising numbers, and led a protest where the debate was held.

Rojas was endorsed by Julia Salazar, a New York state senator, former City Council candidates Moumita Ahmed and Carolyn Tran, and Kristin Richardson Jordan, an activist and council member.

Rojas received 27,982 votes, or 2.49% in the election, which was easily won by Democrat Eric Adams.

Electoral record

References

Candidates in the 2021 United States elections
Educators from New York City
Party for Socialism and Liberation politicians
Living people
21st-century American educators
21st-century American women educators
American people of Colombian descent
1991 births